The ninth and final competition weekend of the 2008–09 ISU Speed Skating World Cup was a three-day event with races in all cups except the team pursuits, held at the Utah Olympic Oval in Salt Lake City, United States, from Friday, March 6, until Sunday, March 8, 2009.

American Shani Davis set new world records for the 1000 and 1500 meters distances.

Schedule of events
Schedule of the event:

Medal winners

Men's events

Women's events

References

9
Isu World Cup, 2008-09, 9
Sports in Salt Lake City